Copper manipulation may refer to:
 List of copper alloys
 Sumitomo copper affair in the mid-1990s
 United Copper affair in 1907